Zacorisca cyprantha is a species of moth of the family Tortricidae. It is found on New Guinea.

The wingspan is about 25 mm. The forewings are deep indigo blue, with a narrow deep coppery-red terminal fascia. The hindwings are deep indigo blue, but the posterior half is deep coppery red.

References

	

Moths described in 1924
Zacorisca